Luna de Fuego is the second studio album by the Gipsy Kings, released in 1983 in Europe.

Background
Just like Allegria, Luna de Fuego is denoted to be more traditional than their next albums with only acoustic guitars, voices, and hand claps. In 1990, the album was merged with Allegria while omitting certain tracks for a re-release to a United States audience under Allegria (US Version). Luna de Fuego includes "Gipsyrock", which was never released in the US.

Reception
A reviewer of AllMusic stated "This French import is their first album from 1983, and it is a much more traditional affair, with only acoustic guitars, voices, and hand claps. It shows that artistically the sound did not need to be beefed up; the music is still wonderful. How can an array of seven guitars and full-throated passion not be wonderful?"

Track listing

Credits
Pierre Braner – Engineer
Gipsy Kings – Composer, Primary Artist
Los Reyes – Composer

References

External links
Luna De Fuego at gipsykings.net

1983 albums
Gipsy Kings albums